Ampampamena Airport  is an airport serving Ambanja, Madagascar.

See also

List of airports in Madagascar

References

External links

Airports in Madagascar